This is a list of members of the 36th Legislative Assembly of Queensland from 1960 to 1963, as elected at the 1960 state election held on 28 May 1960.

It was conducted on redistributed boundaries based on the Electoral Districts Act 1958, so a number of seats were abolished or created at the election.

 On 7 May 1960, three weeks before the 1960 state election, Carlisle Wordsworth, the Country member for Mulgrave, died. The election was therefore postponed in Mulgrave until 23 July 1960, when the Country Party candidate Roy Armstrong was elected.
 On 10 March 1961, the Labor member for Barcoo, Ned Davis, died. Labor candidate Eugene O'Donnell won the resulting by-election on 1 July 1961.
 On 11 March 1961, the Country member for Whitsunday, Lloyd Roberts, died. Country Party candidate Ron Camm won the resulting by-election on 1 July 1961.
 In late 1961, the Queensland Labor Party, which had split from the Labor Party in 1957 following a dispute between then-Premier Vince Gair and the party executive, became the Queensland branch of the Democratic Labor Party (DLP) after agreements were formed on a range of issues. As a direct result, Adair and Walsh, who had never favoured an alliance with the DLP, resigned from the merged party and continued as independents until the end of their Parliamentary careers.
 On 24 January 1963, the Liberal member for Mount Gravatt, Graham Hart, resigned. No by-election was called due to the proximity of the 1963 state election.
 Jim Houghton, a City of Redcliffe alderman who had at one stage been a member of the Country Party, was elected in Redcliffe as an Independent. He subsequently joined the Liberal Party, but Country Party members of the Coalition refused to admit him to combined party meetings. In October 1961, he resigned from the parliamentary group but remained a lay member of the Liberal Party. In late 1962 he rejoined the Country Party.

See also
1960 Queensland state election
Nicklin Ministry (Country Party) (1957–1968)

References

 Waterson, D.B. Biographical register of the Queensland Parliament, 1930-1980 Canberra: ANU Press (1982)
 

Members of Queensland parliaments by term
20th-century Australian politicians